is a Japanese judoka. She is a two-time gold medalist in the women's 52 kg event at the World Judo Championships.

Career
She won a gold medal at the 2017 World Judo Championships in Budapest.

In 2019, she won the gold medal in the women's 52 kg event at the Judo World Masters held in Qingdao, China. In January 2021, she won the silver medal in her event at the Judo World Masters held in Doha, Qatar. In June 2021, she won the silver medal in the women's 52 kg event at the World Judo Championships held in Budapest, Hungary.

References

External links
 
 

1994 births
Living people
Japanese female judoka
World judo champions
Universiade bronze medalists for Japan
Universiade medalists in judo
Medalists at the 2013 Summer Universiade
21st-century Japanese women